Thomas or Tom Leighton may refer to:
Thomas Leighton (fl.1485), MP for Shropshire (UK Parliament constituency)
Thomas Leighton (died 1600), MP for Shropshire
Thomas Leighton (surgeon) (died 1848), surgeon to the general hospital of Newcastle-upon-Tyne
Thomas M. Leighton, American politician
Thomas Leighton (governor), 16th century Governor of Guernsey and MP for Worcestershire

See also

Thomas Layton (disambiguation)